Napasorsuaq Fjord or Napasorsuup Kangerlua (also known as 'Napassorssuaq Fjord' and 'Kangerdlugsuatsiak') is a fjord of the King Frederick VI Coast in the Sermersooq municipality, southeastern Greenland.

Geography
{ "type": "ExternalData", "service": "geoshape", "ids": "Q24727779", "properties": { "fill": "#0050d0"}}
Napasorsuaq Fjord's mouth is located between Puisortup Kangerlua to the north and Anorituup Kangerlua to the south. It extends in a roughly east–west direction for about 20 km, bending in a NW/SE direction for a further 15 km, then it bends again in a NE/SW direction for a further 7 km. 
To the east the fjord opens into the North Atlantic Ocean. At its head there are three large glaciers.

The northern side of the entrance of the fjord is Cape Daniel Rantzau, the SE headland of an irregularly-shaped coastal island located on the northern side of the mouth of the fjord —on the same island on which the Cape Cort Adelaer weather station stood. The island is separated from the mainland coast by the Tunua sound.

Mountains
There are high mountains rising on both sides of the fjord towards the inner side.

See also
List of fjords of Greenland

References

External links
New insights on the north-eastern part of the Ketilidian orogen in South-East Greenland
Weather statistics for Napasorsuaq Fjord, Kujalleq (Greenland)
Fjords of Greenland